Pabellón Polideportivo Ipurua is an arena in Eibar, Spain.  It is primarily used for team handball and is the home arena of JD Arrate.  The arena holds 3,500 people.

Handball venues in Spain
Indoor arenas in Spain
Eibar
Sports venues in the Basque Country (autonomous community)